Michael Anthony Haywood (born February 26, 1964) is a former American college football player and coach. He previously served as the head football coach at Miami University of Ohio from 2009 to 2010 and Texas Southern University (TSU) from 2016 to 2018. He also served as an assistant coach at various other universities for 21 seasons.  Haywood was initially hired as the head football coach at the University of Pittsburgh in December 2010, but was fired from that position shortly thereafter following domestic violence charges that he pleaded guilty to and received a plea deal agreed to by victim. Haywood played college football at the University of Notre Dame as a wide receiver and  defensive back from 1984 to 1986.

Early life
Haywood was born in Houston, Texas.  He attended St. Thomas High School in Houston and then the University of Notre Dame where he played as a wide receiver wearing jersey #1.

Early coaching career
Haywood served as an assistant at several college football programs, most notably under Nick Saban at LSU, under Mack Brown at Texas and under Charlie Weis at his alma mater Notre Dame. In December 2007, Haywood was considered one of the two leading candidates for the head coaching position at the University of Houston, alongside Jack Pardee. However, the job eventually went to Kevin Sumlin.

Miami University (Ohio)
In December 2008, Haywood was named the head coach of the Miami RedHawks. He replaced Shane Montgomery. After going 1–11 in his first season, Haywood led the Redhawks to an 8–4 record in his second season and a MAC East title. The Redhawks then emerged victorious in the 2010 MAC Championship Game against Northern Illinois University, winning by a final score of 26–21. He was named the 2010 Mid-American Conference football coach of the year.

University of Pittsburgh
On December 16, 2010, Haywood was offered and accepted the head football coaching position at the University of Pittsburgh.  However, Haywood was arrested in South Bend, Indiana on December 31, 2010, on felony domestic violence charges. He was released on bond on January 1, 2011, and only hours later was fired by Pitt. In February 2012, the domestic violence charges were dismissed after Haywood completed pre-trial diversion requirements, counseling, and public service.

Coaching interviews
Haywood interviewed for the Tulane head coaching position in November 2011. However, the job went to Curtis Johnson.

Texas Southern
On December 3, 2015, Haywood was offered and accepted the head football coaching position at Texas Southern University in Houston, Texas. He replaced Darrell Asberry who resigned after a 12–31 record in four years at Texas Southern. Haywood resigned in 2018 after three years as the TSU Head Coach.

Head coaching record

*Lance Guidry coached bowl game

References

1964 births
Living people
Army Black Knights football coaches
Ball State Cardinals football coaches
LSU Tigers football coaches
Miami RedHawks football coaches
Minnesota Golden Gophers football coaches
Notre Dame Fighting Irish football coaches
Notre Dame Fighting Irish football players
Ohio Bobcats football coaches
Texas Longhorns football coaches
Texas Southern Tigers football coaches
Sportspeople from Houston
Players of American football from Houston
African-American coaches of American football
African-American players of American football
21st-century African-American people
20th-century African-American sportspeople